Hollywood Pinball is a 1999 pinball video game developed by Tarantula Studios, first published by Take-Two Interactive Software in the EU for Game Boy Color in 1999. Hollywood Pinball was not released within the United States.

Hollywood Pinball is a pinball game with several different themed boards taking inspiration from popular movies of the time.

Gameplay 

Hollywood Pinball is a pinball video game designed for single-player where players can play a remake of pinball on various movie and Hollywood themed game boards.

References 

Game Boy Color games
Take-Two Interactive games
1999 video games
Pinball video games
Video games developed in the United Kingdom